Yenidje Tobacco Company Limited was a British tobacco company founded in 1913 by Louis Rothman and Markus Weinberg. The company was named for the town of Yenidje, Thrace (modern Genisea, Greece), a leading producer of high-quality Oriental tobaccos for cigarettes.

A dispute over business strategy lead to the dissolution of the company by the Court of Appeal's decision In re Yenidje Tobacco Co Ltd [1916] 2 Ch 426, which remains a leading authority on the dissolution of partnerships.

References

 Rothmans UK Holdings Limited, Company History

Tobacco companies of the United Kingdom
Manufacturing companies established in 1913
Manufacturing companies disestablished in 1916
1913 establishments in England
1916 disestablishments in England
British companies disestablished in 1916
British companies established in 1913